Pocketbook may refer to:

Pouch or bag
 Coin purse, a small money bag or pouch, made for carrying coins
 Handbag, a large bag for carrying personal items, also known as a purse.

Art, entertainment, media
 A notebook (in British English), as carried by people such as police officers for keeping records.
 "Pocketbook" (song), a 2009 single by Jennifer Hudson
 Paperback, a type of book binding often referred to as a "pocket book"
 Pocket edition, an abridged edition of a book or a small-size book made to be carried in the pocket
 Pocketbook (application), a Sydney-based free budget planner and personal finance app
 Pocket Books, a division of Simon & Schuster that primarily publishes paperback books

Brands and companies
 PocketBook International, a maker of PocketBook brand e-book readers and tablet computers, and publisher of BookLand ebooks
 Acorn Pocket Book